Softball at the 2011 Southeast Asian Games was held at the Jakabaring Sport Complex, Palembang, Indonesia.

Men's tournament

Preliminary round

Knockout round

Medalists

Women's tournament

Preliminary round

Knockout round

Medalists

References
SEAG2011 Start/Result Lists - Softball
SEAG2011 Event List - Softball

2011 Southeast Asian Games events
Southeast Asian Games
2011
Softball in Indonesia